The News Letter is one of Northern Ireland's main daily newspapers, published from Monday to Saturday. It is the world's oldest English-language general daily newspaper still in publication, having first been printed in 1737.

The newspaper's editorial stance and readership, while originally republican at the time of its inception, is now unionist. Its primary competitors are the Belfast Telegraph and The Irish News.

The News Letter has changed hands several times since the mid-1990s, and is now owned by JPIMedia (since 2018). It was formerly known as the Belfast News Letter, but its coverage spans the whole of Northern Ireland (and often Great Britain and the Republic of Ireland), and the word Belfast does not appear on the masthead any more.

History 

Founded in 1737, the News Letter was printed in Joy's Entry in Belfast. It is one of a series of narrow alleys in the city centre, and is currently home to Henry's Pub (formerly McCracken's) – named after Henry Joy McCracken, an Irish Presbyterian and a leading member in the north of Ireland of the republican Society of the United Irishmen, and the grandson of the News Letter founder.

The Joy family were of Huguenot descent and were very active in the life of 18th-century Belfast, being noted for compiling materials about its history. Francis Joy, who founded the paper, had come to Belfast early in the century from the County Antrim village of Killead. In Belfast, he married the daughter of the town sovereign (mayor), and set up a practice as an attorney.

In 1737, in settlement of a debt, he obtained a small printing press and used it to publish the town's first newspaper in Bridge Street. The family later bought a paper mill in Ballymena, and were able to produce enough paper not only for their own publication but for the whole of Ulster.

The earliest available edition of the News Letter that survives is from 3 October 1738 (which is equivalent to 14 October in the modern calendar).

Samples from that antiquated edition include reports about a highway robbery (where a bandit "took from a Sardinian Gentleman a Purse of Guineas and a rich Scimitar", among other things) at Newbury and the theft of a horse ("Four Years Old, and about Fourteen hands high") at Ballyhome.

Over the centuries, the News Letter reports have spanned the rule of 77 different prime ministers and 10 monarchs. It is one of the only newspapers still in business which reported on the US Declaration of Independence (carrying the news in an addition in late August 1776).

Originally published three times weekly, it became daily in 1855. Before the partition of Ireland, the News Letter was distributed island-wide.

The Troubles 

On 20 March 1972, the newspaper's offices, then in Donegall Street in the north of the city centre, were bombed by the IRA. The paper reported at the time that "two false alarms were phoned in about another bomb just around the corner in Church Street; people were evacuated – towards the real bomb".

It detonated at 11.58 am, three minutes after an accurate warning had been given about the bomb's whereabouts. Seven people died, and over 140 were injured (with some staff among the wounded). Nevertheless, the paper came out the next day.

One of the recurring motifs of the News Letter editorial line today is to remind people of the scale of the paramilitary bloodshed during the Troubles, with the vast bulk of crimes being unsolved.

Today 
In recent years, the paper's business model has focussed on increasing subscriptions (home delivery and collection for the print edition, mobile devices/laptops for the digital one). A paywall structure is in operation online, allowing people to read five articles per week without subscribing (though some content is purposely kept behind the paywall). In the second half of 2016 the News Letter was the fastest-growing regional news site in the UK.

Historical copies of the News Letter, dating back to 1828, are available to search and view in digitised form at the British Newspaper Archive. There are also historic copies of the News Letter available for public access in the Belfast Newspaper Library, at the north end of the city centre, attached to the main Belfast Central Library.  Back copies of the physical newspaper can be bought, going back three months.

Other publications 
The paper publishes the agricultural supplement Farming Life on Wednesdays and Saturdays, included within the newspaper itself. It publishes a weekend supplement on Saturdays, containing features and commentary and TV guide. It also publishes a supplement for the Twelfth of July celebrations.

In addition to the News Letter coverage of the Renewable Heat Incentive scandal  from 2016 to the present, a book entitled Burned: The Inside Story of the 'Cash-for-Ash' Scandal and Northern Ireland's Secretive New Elite, by its (now former) political correspondent Sam McBride (a frequent media commentator on Northern Irish affairs), was published in 2019 by Merrion.

Print circulation

References

External links 
News Letter online

1737 establishments in Ireland
Publications established in 1737
Mass media in Belfast
Newspapers published in Northern Ireland
Johnston Publishing (NI)
Newspapers published by Johnston Press